Jake David Fawcett (born 22 March 1990) is an Australian cricketer. He has played two List A cricket games for Western Australia. In the Ashes series against England he was a substitute fielder when Ryan Harris got Paul Collingwood on the last ball of the day. In 2012, he was a contestant on the reality television show Cricket Superstar.

References

External links
Cricket Superstar profile

1990 births
Australian cricketers
Living people
Western Australia cricketers
Sportsmen from Western Australia
Cricketers from Perth, Western Australia